"King Ruby" is a song recorded by English singer-songwriter duo Ider. It was self-released on 23 September 2016. It features on the soundtrack of the 2017 Electronic Arts video game FIFA 18.

Background and composition
"King Ruby" is the third single to be released by Ider, after "Sorry" and "Pulse" earlier in 2016. Ider released this single themselves as they didn't first sign with a record label until the following year.

The song was inspired by a friend of the duo, Ruby, who had been involved in an accident in India and undertook a large recovery.

Critical reception
Writing for The Line of Best Fit, Andrew Hannah says that "[…] "King Ruby" as a whole is just superb. This is the sound of a band already well into their stride and racing ahead of the competition."

Track listing
Digital download
 "King Ruby" – 3:40

References

2016 singles
2016 songs
Ider (band) songs